is a Japanese manga artist. He is best known outside Japan for his manga series Nono-chan, which was adapted into the Studio Ghibli anime film My Neighbors the Yamadas. Topics covered by Ishii's manga include baseball (in his debut work), politics, economics, current events and topics, philosophy, and so on. He is known for his extreme caricatures of well-known celebrities and well known people, including Kōichi Tabuchi (a pro baseball catcher in Japan), Kim Jong Il, and Tsuneo Watanabe (executive director of the Yomiuri Shimbun Holdings group, owner of the Yomiuri Shimbun).

Ishii graduated with a degree in sociology at Kansai University.

Works
Listed alphabetically.

Baito-kun (debut professional work)

Doughnuts Books

Ishii Hisaichi's CNN

Nono-chan (formerly titled My Neighbors the Yamadas)

Ojamanga Yamada-kun

Sources:

References

External links

 
1951 births
Living people
Kansai University alumni
Manga artists from Okayama Prefecture
People from Okayama Prefecture
Winner of Tezuka Osamu Cultural Prize (Short Story Award)